Oakleigh Barracks is an installation of the Australian Army. It is located in the suburb of Oakleigh South. It is situated on North Road, close to Huntingdale Railway Station.

Address - 1318 North Road, Oakleigh South, Victoria, 3167

Currently, it is host to the following Units - Sub units:

22nd Engineer Regiment
Royal Australian Engineers (RAE)

3rd Health Battalion - 6th /10th Health Support Company
Royal Australian Army Medical Corps (RAAMC), 
Royal Australian Army Nursing Corps (RAANC),
Royal Australian Army Dental Corps (RAADC),
Australian Army Psychology Corps (AAPC),
Royal Australian Army Ordinance Corps (RAAOC), 
Royal Australian Army Corps of Transport (RACT)

Australian Army Cadets
302nd Army Cadet Unit

Barracks in Australia
Buildings and structures in the City of Monash